Lawrence G. Brown (born February 6, 1943 in St. Louis, Missouri) is an American mathematician who studies operator algebras.

Brown studied at Harvard University, graduating in 1968 with George Mackey as his advisor and thesis entitled On the Structure of Locally Compact Groups. He was a professor at Purdue University until his retirement.

With Peter A. Fillmore and Ronald G. Douglas, he developed the Brown-Douglas-Fillmore theory in the theory of operator algebras based on techniques of algebraic topology.

See also 
 Real rank (C*-algebras)
 Brown measure

External links 
 Lawrence G. Brown's homepage at Purdue
 His page at the Mathematics Genealogy Project

References

 Brown, L. G.; Douglas, R. G.; Fillmore, P. A., "Extensions of  C*-algebras and K-homology", Annals of Mathematics (2) 105 (1977), no. 2, 265–324.  

20th-century American mathematicians
21st-century American mathematicians
1943 births
Living people
Operator theorists
Harvard University alumni
People from St. Louis
Purdue University faculty
Mathematicians from Missouri